Fast & Furious: Original Motion Picture Soundtrack is the soundtrack to Justin Lin's 2009 action film Fast & Furious. It was released on March 31, 2009 via Star Trak Entertainment and Interscope Records. Production was primarily handled by The Neptunes. It features contributions from Pitbull, Pharrell Williams, Busta Rhymes, Don Omar, Kenna, Lil' Jon, M.I.A., Natasha Ramos, Robin Thicke, Rye Rye, Shark City Click and Tego Calderón.

Track listing

Charts

References

External links

Hip hop soundtracks
Fast & Furious albums
2009 soundtrack albums
Action film soundtracks
Albums produced by Lil Jon
Albums produced by the Neptunes
Star Trak Entertainment compilation albums